The Roman Emperors Route is a tourism and archaeology project in Serbia, a route spanning 600 km with several ancient Roman sites, among which are notable cities, estates and birthplaces (see Roman heritage in Serbia). The project's name is derived from the fact that 17 Roman emperors were born within the current borders of Serbia, the second country after Italy itself. The sites include the important Roman cities of Sirmium, Felix Romuliana (which is a UNESCO World Heritage site) and Naissus. The project is regarded as one of the largest archeological and tourism projects in Serbia, and the project board is guided and financed by the Serbian Ministry of Economy and Regional Development and Ministry of Culture. It is regarded as one of the national brands of Serbia.

Sites

See also
Roman Serbia
UNESCO World Heritage Sites in Serbia

External links 
Brosure of the Roman Emperors Route

Sites presentation for the "Itinerarium Romanum Serbiae"
Official map of the route "Itinerarium Romanum Serbiae"

References 

Emperors
Roman emperors
Serbia in the Roman era
Roman sites in Serbia
Tourism in Serbia
Archaeological sites in Serbia
Historic sites in Serbia
Tourist attractions in Serbia